Moifaa was a New Zealand-bred racehorse who won the 1904 Grand National by eight lengths. The jockey was Arthur Birch and the owner at the time was Spencer Gollan.

After winning the Grand National the 17 hand gelding was purchased for King Edward VII, but never won again and was soon thereafter retired to the hunting fields of Leicestershire.

The popular story that Moifaa survived a shipwreck before winning the Grand National is not true. Another contender in the 1904 Grand National, an Australian-bred gelding named Kiora, did survive a shipwreck off the coast of Cape Town in October 1899, where he was found standing on a rock near the site of the wreck. Another horse on board named Chesney allegedly swam a great distance to shore.

See also
 List of historical horses

References

External links
 Moifaa's pedigree

1896 racehorse births
Racehorses bred in New Zealand
Racehorses trained in New Zealand
Racehorses trained in the United Kingdom
National Hunt racehorses
Grand National winners
Byerley Turk sire line
Non-Thoroughbred racehorses